Scenes from the South Island is the debut studio album of guitarist and composer Roy Montgomery, released on 5 September 1995 by Drunken Fish Records. The album was remastered and reissued on 29 November 2019 by Liz Harris' label, Yellow Electric. The reissue includes three additional songs not present on the original release, and also clarifies the proper titles and running order of the original songs.

Track listing

1995 Release

2019 Reissue

Personnel 
Adapted from the Scenes from the South Island liner notes.
Roy Montgomery – guitar, EBow on "Twilight Conversation", mixing, recording
Production and additional personnel
Brendan Burke – mixing
Jessica Meyer – photography, design

Release history

References

External links 
 

1995 debut albums
Roy Montgomery albums
Drunken Fish Records albums